MFFA may refer to:

 Montana Firearms Freedom Act
 Master Financial Assistance Facility Agreement, see Second Economic Adjustment Programme for Greece
 My Friends From Afar, a Singaporean TV series
 Mugen Free For All, a forum for the fighting game engine M.U.G.E.N.